The 2014 Pan American Ice Hockey Tournament was the first Pan American Ice Hockey Tournament, an annual event run by the Federación Deportiva de México de Hockey sobre Hielo. It took place in Mexico City, Mexico between March 2 and March 9, 2014. Canada won the tournament, winning all five of its game and defeating Mexico in the gold-medal game. Colombia finished third place after defeating Argentina in the bronze-medal game.

Participants
North America
 
  (host)

South America

Round-robin

Standings

Schedules
(UTC–06:00)

Final round
Bronze medal game
(UTC–06:00)

Gold medal game
(UTC–06:00)

Final standings

References

Pan American Ice Hockey Tournament
Pan American Ice Hockey Tournament
2014
Pan American Ice Hockey Tournament
2014